Tribromometacresol is an antifungal medication. This compound belongs to the class of organic compounds known as meta cresols, containing a meta cresol moiety which consists of a benzene ring bearing a methyl group and a hydroxyl group at ring positions 1 and 3, respectively.

References

Antimicrobials
Bromoarenes
Phenols